Minerva University (formerly Minerva Schools at Keck Graduate Institute) is a private university headquartered in San Francisco, California. It was established in 2012 using $25million in venture funding from Benchmark Capital.

The university employs a unique pedagogical model in which all classes are conducted as online seminars capped at 19 students.

History

Minerva Project
In April 2012, Minerva Project received  in venture funding from Benchmark Capital to create the undergraduate program that would become the Minerva Schools at KGI. Stephen Kosslyn joined Minerva in March 2013 to serve as Founding Dean. Before joining Minerva, Kosslyn served as Director of the Center for Advanced Study in the Behavioral Sciences at Stanford University and Dean of Social Sciences at Harvard University. Kosslyn was responsible for hiring the heads of the four colleges in the School of Arts & Science and overseeing the development of Minerva's seminar-based curriculum.

Minerva Schools at Keck Graduate Institute
In July 2013, Minerva Project partnered with the Keck Graduate Institute to officially launch the Minerva Schools at Keck Graduate Institute.

Minerva received WASC regional accreditation for five of its programs: the Bachelor of Science in Social Sciences, the Bachelor of Arts in Arts and Humanities, the Bachelor of Science in Natural Sciences, the Bachelor of Science in Computational Sciences, and the Bachelor of Science in business.

Minerva admitted its first class in 2014. The school offered places to 69 students, out of 2,464 applications. 29 students matriculated in and granted 69 acceptances resulting in a 2.8% acceptance rate and a 42% yield.

Starting in 2016, Minerva expanded into postgraduate education by offering a Master of Science in Decision Analysis.

In 2020, Minerva created its Visiting Scholars year. The one-year program, completed remotely, offers the four Cornerstone Courses (see Pedagogy) to students accepted into a leading college or university who face challenges attending in residence for the 2020–21 academic year due to COVID-19.

Accreditation 
The university is accredited by the WASC Senior College and University Commission. It first earned this accreditation in 2021 when it became a separate, independent  institution under the Minerva Institute, the non-profit entity that was already operating the Minerva Schools at Keck Graduate Institute alongside the Keck Graduate Institute.

Academic departments 

Under its first accreditation plan, Minerva's primary academic institution was its School of Arts and Sciences, which included the College of Social Sciences, the College of Natural Sciences, the College of Computational Sciences, and the College of Arts and Humanities. When the Bachelor of Science in Business was approved by WASC, it led to the creation of the School (and College) of Business. In May 2018, the schools were restructured into two divisions: the Division of Arts and Sciences and the Division of Business and Computational Sciences.

In late 2015, Minerva's Master's in Applied Arts and Sciences program received approval and regional accreditation. Students could take this Masters either integrated with their undergraduate studies or following completion of their B.A./B.S. This led to the creation of the Graduate Division, which is currently overseen by Joshua Fost. Subsequently, Minerva pivoted to a Master of Science in Decision Analysis programme, without the concurrent studies option.

Professors are trained to use Minerva's proprietary learning platform, the Minerva Forum. Faculty retain intellectual property rights to their research.

Pedagogy 

Courses are conducted as online seminars capped at 19 students. Minerva applies a 1972 study that shows that memory is enhanced by "deep" cognitive tasks. Such tasks include working with materials, applying it, and arguing about it instead of rote memorization. All classes begin with a short quiz and end with a second one later in the class; this is claimed to increase retention. Student performance is automatically recorded for tracking.

Students initially take four "Cornerstone Courses" that introduce "Habits of Mind" and "Foundational Concepts" that cut across the sciences and humanities. The four "Cornerstone Courses" are Empirical Analyses, Formal Analyses, Complex Systems, and Multimodal Communications. In Empirical Analyses, students learn about evaluating and analyzing scientific methods and use that knowledge to build problem-solving proposal. In Formal Analyses, students learn to evaluate and perform data analyses, and perform design thinking skills using game theory and classification method. In a humanities class, students learn the classical techniques of rhetoric and develop basic persuasive skills. Finally, in social science class, students learn about the characteristics of complex systems (intended to represent social interaction), and leaderships, self-awareness, and negotiation. Minerva encourages students to use massive open online courses to learn what is typically taught in first-year courses.

Facilities 

Minerva maintains one residence hall in San Francisco, California, on Turk Street, as well as ones in Seoul, Hyderabad, Berlin, Buenos Aires, London, and Taipei.

Minerva has no classroom facilities, since all classes are conducted through an active learning platform developed by the school, where students participate in seminar classes of up to 19 people.

Notable alumni

 Jade Bowler, British YouTuber known as Unjaded Jade; attended Minerva 2019-pres.

See also 

 Levels-of-processing effect

References

External links 

 

Private universities and colleges in California
Education in San Francisco
2012 establishments in California
Universities and colleges in San Francisco